This is a list of newsreels by country.

Algeria

Actualités Algériennes

Argentina

Informativo Cinematográfico EPA
Noticiario Panamericano
Noticiero Argentina al Día
Sucesos Argentinos

Australia

Cinesound Productions
Movietone News

Belgium

Belgavox

Bulgaria

Kinokronika

Brazil

Canal 100

Canada

Associated Screen News of Canada
Canada Carries On and The World in Action were World War II-related newsreels produced by the National Film Board of Canada
Canadian Army Newsreel produced by the Canadian Army Film and Photo Unit, for internal consumption only.

Chile

Noticiario Chileno Emelco
Chile en marcha
Noticiario Nacional Chilefilms
Visión de Chile
Chile Color
Noticiario Regional

China
China Today
Xinwen Jianbao
Democratic Northeast

Cuba

Noticiero Latinoamericano ICAIC

Czechoslovakia

Československý filmový týdeník

France
Fox Movietone, a French subsidiary produced by Fox Europa
Gaumont-Actualités
Pathé-Journal
Éclair-Journal
Actualités Françaises

Germany

From 1925 to 1930

 UFA Wochenschau

From 1930 to 1933

 UFA-Tonwoche
 Deulig-Tonwoche
 Fox Tönende Wochenschau
 Emelka-Tonwoche
 Tobis Wochenschau

Nazi Germany

 UFA-Tonwoche (Until 1940)
 Die Deutsche Wochenschau – (The German Weekly Newsreel)

German Democratic Republic

Der Augenzeuge
DEFA Wochenschau

Federal Republic of Germany

Welt im Film
Neue Deutsche Wochenschau
Die Zeit unter der Lupe
Blick in die Welt
Welt im Bild
UFA Wochenschau
Fox Tönende Wochenschau

Hungary
Magyar Filmhirado

India
Indian News Parade

Ireland
Amharc Éireann
Universal Irish News

Italy
 Giornale LUCE
 La Settimana Incom
 Ciac
 Cinemondo (Corona Cinematografica)
 Obiettivo Cinegiornale
 Mondo Libero ASTRA
 Fox Cinegiornale

Japan
 Mainichi World News/Daimai News (Mainichi Shimbun/Daiei/Riken) 1947–1970 
 Nikkatsu World News/Mainichi News (Mainichi Shimbun/Nikkatsu) 1954–1993
 Nippon News/Asahi News (Asahi Shimbun/Nippon Eiga/Toho) 1940–1992
 Toei News (Toei Company/TV Asahi) 1959–1978
 Yomiuri International News (Yomiuri Shimbun/Shochiku) 1949–1997

South Korea
 Daehan News (1953-1994)

Mozambique
 Kuxa Kanema

Netherlands
Polygoon

Netherlands Indies
 Djawa Hodo (Japanese occupation)
 Nampo Hodo (Japanese occupation)
 Berita Film di Djawa (Japanese occupation)
 Wordende Wereld

Netherlands New Guinea
 Nieuw-Guinea Kroniek

New Zealand
Weekly Review
Pictorial Parade

Norway
Filmavisen

Poland
 Polska Agencja Telegraficzna (Polish Telegraphic Agency) PAT (1927-1945)
 Polska Kronika Filmowa (Polish Film Chronicle) (1944-1995)

Portugal
 Jornal do Condes (Castello-Lopes) (1918-192?)
 Jornal Português (Secretariado de Propaganda Nacional) (1938-1951)
 Imagens de Portugal (Secretariado Nacional de Informação) (1951-196?)

Romania
 Carpathia Jurnal (1931 - ?)
 Jurnal sonor (1937-8? - 1941)
 Jurnal de război (1941 - 1944)
 Jurnalul cinema ONC-UFA (1942 - 1944?)
 Jurnalul militar (1948)
 Jurnalul de actualităţi (post WWII)
 Săptămîna în imagini

Soviet Union
Cinema Week (translit. Kino Nedelya; 1918-1920)
Kino-Pravda (1922-1925)
Novosti dnya (1944-1983)

Spain
No-Do (1943-1981)

Sweden
  SF-Journalen

Switzerland
 Ciné-Journal Suisse

United Kingdom
British Movietone News, the first British sound newsreel, and the last (1929-1979).
British Paramount News
Pathe's Animated Gazette (1910), Weekly
Pathé Gazette
Eve's Film Review
British Pathé News
Empire Newsreel
Empire News Bulletin
Gaumont Graphic
Around the Town
Gaumont Mirror
The Gen produced by Royal Air Force
Topical Budget (1911-1931); in 1917 was taken over by the War Office, became War Office Official Topical Budget; eventually Pictorial News.
BBC Television Newsreel (1948-1954)
Universal News
Workers' Topical News (1930-31)
Worker's Week-End (1943)

United States
Columbia Pictures' Newsreel (Columbia Pictures) 1931-1972
 Hearst Metrotone News 1914–1967
Hearst-Selig News Pictorial 1914-1915 
 Hearst-Vitagraph News Pictorial 1915-1916
International Newsreels
The March of Time (Warner Bros./Time, Inc.) 1935-1951
Movietone News (20th Century Fox) 1928-1963
News of the Day (Metro-Goldwyn-Mayer) 1930-1974
Pathé News 1910-1956
RKO-Pathé (RKO Pictures/Pathé)
Warner-Pathé (Warner Brothers Studios/Pathé)
Paramount News (Paramount Pictures) 1925-1957
Universal Newsreel (Universal Studios) 1929-1967
U.S. Information Service
Workers Film and Photo League (Communist Party USA) 1920s-1936

Yugoslavia
Filmske Novosti

Venezuela
Bolivar Films

See also

California Newsreel

External links

British newsreels
A History of the British Newsreels
Digital News Archive – British Pathé

German newsreels
German newsreel archives - Wochenschau Archiv

Italian newsreels
Italian newsreel archives - Archivio Istituto Luce (100.000 videos)

Soviet newsreels
CSDF-Museum: magazines (1931–1993)
Kinozhurnaly ″Novosti dnya″